Acanthoecidae is a family of choanoflagellates.

Genera
Acanthocorbis - Acanthoeca - Amoenoscopa - Apheloecion - Bicosta - Calliacantha - Calotheca - Campyloacantha - Conion - Cosmoeca - Crinolina - Crucispina - Diaphanoeca - Diplotheca - Kakoeca - Monocosta - Nannoeca - Parvicorbicula - Platypleura - Pleurasiga - Polyfibula - Polyoeca - Saepicula - Saroeca - Savillea - Spiraloecion - Stephanacantha - Stephanoeca - Syndetophyllum

References

External links
 

Opisthokont families
Choanoflagellatea